Becerreá is a municipality in Galicia, Spain, in the province of Lugo.

Situated in the eastern mountain range of the province, Becerreá occupies an extension of 173.3 km2 and forms part of the Region of Los Ancares, which contains the departure points of the access routes. It accounts for 113 entities of population, and 26 parishes (Agueira, Armesto, Becerreá, Cadoalla, Cascallá, Cereixal, Cruzul, Ferreiros de Balboa, Fontarón, Furco, Guilfrei, Guillen, Liber, Morcelle, Oselle, Ousón, Pando, Penamaior, Quintá, Sevane, Vilar de Ouson, Veiga, Vilacha, Vilaiz, Vilamane, Vilouta).

Demography

Population: 2.827 inhabitants (INE 2018).

Geography

Altitude: 668 meters. 
Latitude: 42° 51' N 
Longitude: 007° 10' W

References

External links
 More info of Becerreá

Municipalities in the Province of Lugo